Events from the year 1737 in Denmark.

Incumbents
 Monarch – Christian VI
 Prime minister – Johan Ludvig Holstein-Ledreborg

Events
 28 November  Vallø Stift is established.

Undated

Births
 22 March  Ernst Peymann, army officer (died 1823)
 30 September – Morten Thrane Brünnich, natural scientist (died 1827)

Deaths
 23 March – Bendix Grodtschilling the Youngest, painter (died 1686)
 9 October  Christen Worm, theologian (born 1782)

References

 
1730s in Denmark
Years of the 18th century in Denmark